Events in the year 2005 in Turkey.

Incumbents
President: Ahmet Necdet Sezer
Prime Minister: Recep Tayyip Erdoğan 
Speaker: Bülent Arınç

Deaths
13 February – Hüdai Oral
24 February – Coşkun Kırca
7 April – Melih Kibar
12 May – Ömer Kavur
3 October – Nurettin Ersin

References

 
Years of the 21st century in Turkey
2000s in Turkey
Turkey
Turkey
Turkey